KAB-1500L is a Russian precision guided weapon, part of KAB-1500 family, a laser guided bomb and also the current production standard for use on 4+ and 4++ generation fighter jets, like the Sukhoi Su-30MKI/Sukhoi Su-30MKK, Sukhoi Su-34 and Sukhoi Su-35. It is claimed to be the Russian equivalent to USA's Paveway II/Paveway III Although it's a much larger device at 6x the size as the paveway is 500lbs so it's a closer match to the KAB-500L that uses similar guidance technology and is designed to hit railway, ammunition depots, railway terminals, highway bridges, military and industrial facilities, ships and transport vessels. The KAB-1500LG-F-E has an impact fuze which includes 3 different delay modes for target attack and it can also be mounted on older aircraft, like the Sukhoi Su-24 and the Mikoyan MiG-27.

The bomb has been used in the Russian military campaigns in Chechnya and Syria.The Bomb has also been used by the Ukrainian Air force.

See also
KAB-1500S-E

References

External links 
Tactical Missiles Corporation JSC

Home - cat-uxo.com

Aerial bombs of Russia
Tactical Missiles Corporation products